The Best of Hal Clement is a collection of science fiction short stories by American author Hal Clement, edited by Lester del Rey. It was first published in paperback by Del Rey/Ballantine in June 1979 as a volume in its Classic Library of Science Fiction. It was reissued in ebook by Gateway/Orion in May 2013, and in trade paperback and ebook by Phoenix Pick in December 2014.

Summary
The book contains ten short works of fiction and an afterword by the author, together with an introduction by editor Lester del Rey.

Contents
"Hal Clement: Rationalist" [introduction] (Lester del Rey)
"Impediment" (from Astounding Science-Fiction, Aug. 1942)
"Technical Error" (from Astounding Science Fiction, Jan. 1944)
"Uncommon Sense" (from Astounding Science Fiction, Sep. 1945)
"Assumption Unjustified" (from Astounding Science Fiction, Oct. 1946)
"Answer" (from Astounding Science Fiction, Apr. 1947)
"Dust Rag" (from Astounding Science Fiction, Sep. 1956)
"Bulge" (from If, Sep. 1968)
"Mistaken for Granted" (from Worlds of If, Jan./Feb. 1974)
"A Question of Guilt" (from The Year's Best Horror Stories: Series IV, Nov. 1976)
"Stuck with It" (from Stellar #2, Feb. 1976)
"Author's Afterword"

Reception
The book was reviewed by Stephen W. Potts in Science Fiction & Fantasy Book Review, Nov. 1979.

Awards
The book placed tenth in the 1980 Locus Poll Award for Best Single Author Collection. "Uncommon Sense" won the 1946 Retro Hugo Award for Best Short Story, awarded in 1996.

Notes

1979 short story collections
Science fiction short story collections
Del Rey books